Abrar Zahoor  (born 16 January 1989) is an Indian actor and model. He started his acting career in the movie Neerja.

Early life and career 
Zahoor moved from Srinagar to Mumbai in 2014. He continued his education there in Madras Christian College matriculation school, and started modeling in 2006 when he was 16. After graduation in visual communication, he earned a diploma in 3D animation and movie making from MAAC in Chennai. After achieving success in modeling in Chennai, he moved to Bangalore in 2010. There he started spending more time with photography and modeling.

In 2016, he made his debut as a Palestinian hijacker in the movie Neerja.

Filmography

Films

References

External links 

Living people
Male actors from Bangalore
Indian male film actors
1989 births
21st-century Indian male actors
Male actors in Hindi cinema
Male actors from Jammu and Kashmir
People from Srinagar